Stanton Drew is a small village and civil parish within the affluent Chew Valley in Somerset, England, lying north of the Mendip Hills,  south of Bristol in the area of the Bath and North East Somerset unitary authority.

Just outside the village are the prehistoric Stanton Drew stone circles. The largest of these, the Great Circle, is a henge monument and the second largest stone circle in Britain, after Avebury. The circle is 113 m in diameter and probably consisted of 30 stones, of which 27 survive today.

The village has a range of listed buildings, dating from the 13th to 15th centuries, including the church of St Mary the Virgin, the Round House (Old Toll House) and several farmhouses.

The parish of Stanton Drew, which includes the hamlet of Stanton Wick, had a population of 787 in 2011.  Until 1947 the parish also included Belluton and part of Pensford. It has a primary school, pubs (the Druids Arms and the Carpenters Arms at Stanton Wick), a church and a village hall, which is the venue for a mother and toddler group and preschool as well as various village activities. The area around the village has several dairy and arable farms on neutral to acid red loamy soils with slowly permeable subsoils. It is also a dormitory village for people working in Bath and Bristol.

History
Stanton Drew was listed in the Domesday Book of 1086 as Stantone, meaning 'The stone enclosure with an oak tree', from the Old English stan and tun and from the Celtic deru.

After the Norman Conquest the Lords of the Manor took their name from the village. In the reign of Henry II Robert de Stanton was succeeded by Geoffrey de Stanton. One of the family Drogo or Drew gave his name to the place to distinguish it from Stanton Prior and Stanton Wick. It subsequently came into the possession of the Choke and then the Cooper and Coates families.

The parish of Stanton Drew was part of the Keynsham Hundred.

Coal mining
There is a long history of coal mining in the parish and the locations of many small pits are still visible in newly ploughed fields. For example the philosopher John Locke who grew up in Belluton owned land in the parish which was being exploited for coal in 1680.

During the 19th and 20th centuries there were three coal mines within the parish. The Rydons mine operated from 1808 until 1833, the Pensford Colliery operated from 1909 to 1955 and the Bromley Pit operated from 1860 - 1957.  These mines formed part of the northern section of the Somerset coalfield.

Governance

The parish council has responsibility for local issues, including setting an annual precept (local rate) to cover the council's operating costs and producing annual accounts for public scrutiny. The parish council evaluates local planning applications and works with the local police, district council officers, and neighbourhood watch groups on matters of crime, security, and traffic. The parish council's role also includes initiating projects for the maintenance and repair of parish facilities, such as the village hall or community centre, playing fields and playgrounds, as well as consulting with the district council on the maintenance, repair, and improvement of highways, drainage, footpaths, public transport, and street cleaning. Conservation matters (including trees and listed buildings) and environmental issues are also of interest to the council.

Along with Chelwood and Clutton, Stanton Drew is part of the Clutton Ward which is represented by one councillor on the unitary authority of Bath and North East Somerset which was created in 1996, as established by the Local Government Act 1992. It provides a single tier of local government with responsibility for almost all local government functions within its area including local planning and building control, local roads, council housing, environmental health, markets and fairs, refuse collection, recycling, cemeteries, crematoria, leisure services, parks, and tourism. It is also responsible for education, social services, libraries, main roads, public transport, Trading Standards, waste disposal and strategic planning, although fire, police and ambulance services are provided jointly with other authorities through the Avon Fire and Rescue Service, Avon and Somerset Constabulary and the Great Western Ambulance Service.

Bath and North East Somerset's area covers part of the ceremonial county of Somerset but it is administered independently of the non-metropolitan county. Its administrative headquarters is in Bath. Between 1 April 1974 and 1 April 1996, it was the Wansdyke district and the City of Bath of the county of Avon. Before 1974 that the parish was part of the Clutton Rural District.

The parish is represented in the House of Commons of the Parliament of the United Kingdom as part of North East Somerset. It elects one Member of Parliament (MP) by the first past the post system of election.

Demographics
According to the 2011 Census, the parish of Stanton Drew, had 787 residents, living in 291 households.

Landmarks

Rectory Farmhouse
The Rectory Farmhouse is a Grade II* listed building, dating from the 15th century. A barn about 35 metres west of the farmhouse dates from the same period, as does a dovecote in the grounds.

The Round House

At the northern entrance to the village before the bridge over the River Chew is a white thatched, 18th-century house which became a toll house when turnpikes were in use. It is a Grade II listed building.

The Court
The Court in Bromley Road dates from 1753 and is a Grade II* listed building. It is now used as a nursing home. The walls and piers around this property are themselves Grade II listed.

Watermill
There is some evidence of a watermill, used as a forge in the 1660s, a copper mill from 1713–1860 and then a paper mill.

Other Grade II listed buildings
There are several other listed buildings in the village, the oldest being the 15th-century Church Farmhouse.

Buildings from the 17th century include Byemills Farmhouse, Codrington Cottage, Stanton Wick Farmhouse, Parson's Farmhouse, and another cottage and attached wall near the church.

Later buildings include those from the 19th century such as: Mill Place, and its accompanying wall and piers, Rosedale, and Fern Cottage.

Bridge

The narrow limestone bridge over the River Chew is possibly 13th or 14th-century in origin with more recent repairs. The bridge spans about 12 metres, about 5 metres across footway, parapet wall to each side, about one metre high. Each side has two pointed arches with chamfered mouldings and relieving arch, central cutwater with off-sets to each side and pyramidal stone top, inner ribs to vaults; on east side, oval plaque with illegible inscription and strengthening with exposed steel girder. Ancient Monument Avon no. 162. The bridge was damaged in the Great Flood of 1968.

Religious sites

The Church of St Mary the Virgin has been a place of Christian worship for at least eight hundred years. In the north aisle is the Norman bowl of the font and further east the small turret steps behind a glass door that in earlier times led up into a rood loft. Although parts date from the 13th and 14th centuries the interior, as it is seen today, shows the work that was carried out in the mid 19th century. It is a Grade II* listed building. The Hazle, Wight Preston and several other unidentified monuments in the churchyard are also listed, along with the piers, gates and overthrow at the north-east entrance to churchyard.

Popular culture
Stanton Drew was commemorated by Adge Cutler in his popular song "When the Common Market Comes to Stanton Drew".
Written in response to opening up of trade with Europe, Adge suggests what might happen to Somerset culture when Europeans come over. 

The Dancers of Stanton Drew is a song written by Jim Parker and Muriel Holland and performed by The Yetties. It tells the story of Sue and William being turned to stone after dancing on a Sunday in Stanton Drew.

"Stanton Drew in the County of Somerset

That's where the Devil played at Sue's request

They paid the price for dancing on a Sunday

Ever as stones they stand at rest"

References

External links

Stanton Drew Primary School
 Stanton Drew Church
 Map of Stanton Drew circa 1884
 River Chew website

Somerset coalfield
Civil parishes in Somerset
Villages in Bath and North East Somerset